This article presents official statistics gathered during the COVID-19 pandemic in Russia.

By federal subject

Progression charts

National

Regional

Total cases
Total cases by federal subject

New daily cases
Daily new cases by federal subject

Maps

Notes

References

COVID-19 pandemic in Russia
Russia